The eastern fiddler ray (Trygonorrhina fasciata), also called the banjo shark, fiddler ray, fiddler, green skate, magpie fiddler ray, parrit, southern fiddler ray or southern fiddler, is a species of fish in the Rhinobatidae family. It is endemic to eastern Australia.  Its natural habitat is open seas.

Sources

eastern fiddler ray
Fauna of New South Wales
Marine fish of Eastern Australia
eastern fiddler ray
Taxonomy articles created by Polbot